The State Poet of Rhode Island is the poet laureate for the U.S. state of Rhode Island. The program was established in 1987, is codified in Chapter 42-100 of the State of Rhode Island General Laws. The five-year appointment by the Governor carries an annual salary of $1,000.

List of Poets Laureate
 Michael S. Harper (1988–1993)
 C.D. Wright (1994–1999)
 Tom Chandler (2000–2007)
 Lisa Starr (2007–2012)
 Rick Benjamin (2013–2016)
 Tina Cane (2016–present)

See also

 Poet laureate
 List of U.S. states' poets laureate
 United States Poet Laureate

References

External links
 Rhode Island Poet Laureate at Library of Congress

 
Rhode Island culture
American Poets Laureate